Franciscus Conradus Palaunsoeka (19 May 1922 – 12 August 1993) was an Indonesian politician.  A long-standing member of the People's Representative Council, he served for eleven terms from 1950 until 1989. Prior to his election, he had also served as a member of the West Borneo Council from 1948 until 1950.

He was also the Chairman of the Dayak Unity Party from 1958 until its dissolution and as the candidate for the Governor of West Kalimantan in 1967. He lost the election to Overste Soemadi.

Notes

References

Bibliography 

1922 births
1993 deaths
Indonesian Roman Catholics
20th-century Indonesian politicians
People from West Kalimantan